The Florida Central Railroad, headquartered in Thomasville, Georgia, constructed a  line between that city and Fanlew, Florida in 1907 and 1908.

The first  ran from Thomasville to the lumber mill in Metcalf, Georgia, then on to Roddenberry. The Florida Central ran parallel to part of an Atlantic Coast Line Railroad line, crossing the ACL near the Florida/Georgia border and then running south to Stringers in extreme northeastern Leon County. From there the FC ran to Miccosukee and Wadesboro in Leon County, then to  Capitola in Leon County (where it crossed the Seaboard Air Line Railroad), Cody in Jefferson County, terminating at Fanlew.

In 1914, the Atlantic Coast Line purchased the Florida Central Railroad.

References

Defunct Florida railroads
Defunct Georgia (U.S. state) railroads
Predecessors of the Atlantic Coast Line Railroad
Railway companies established in 1907
Railway companies disestablished in 1914
History of Leon County, Florida